Nada is a 1947 Spanish drama film directed by Edgar Neville. It is based on Carmen Laforet's famous novel Nada which won the Premio Nadal. It was written by Carmen Laforet.

The novel was filmed also in Argentina in (1956) by Leopoldo Torre Nilsson with the title Graciela.

Although the film is an entirely Spanish production, the cast includes some Italian actors: Fosco Giachetti, María Denis, Adriano Rimoldi.

The film was censored and cut by 34 minutes, so credited actors such as Félix Navarro, María Bru and Rafael Bardem disappeared from the film. The role of José María Mompín was hardly reduced. Most of the Barcelona exteriors were removed.

Cast
Conchita Montes as Andrea
Fosco Giachetti as Román
Tomás Blanco as Juan
Mary Delgado as Gloria
María Cañete as Angustias
Julia Caba Alba as Antonia
María Denis as Ena
Adriano Rimoldi as Jaime

External links
 

1947 films
1940s Spanish-language films
1947 drama films
Spanish black-and-white films
Films based on Spanish novels
Films set in Barcelona
Films directed by Edgar Neville
Spanish drama films
1940s Spanish films